Loulou Lassen (1876-1948) was a Danish journalist.

Lassen was employed as the correspondent of the Dannebrog 1899–1910. She has been referred to as the first Danish woman to work as a career journalist and reporter on equal terms with her male colleagues.

References 

1876 births
1948 deaths
19th-century Danish journalists
20th-century Danish journalists
19th-century women journalists